The Evangelical Church of India (ECI) is a Christian denomination in India. It operates the Allahabad Bible Seminary in Allahabad, the Calcutta Bible Seminary in Kolkata and the Madras Theological Seminary and College in Chennai. Its came into existence because of the activity of the Oriental Missionary Society, (One Mission Society or OMS). The church has more than 100,000 members. The denomination is relatively progressive and, in 2012, ordained its first openly transgender pastor.

References

See also 

Christianity in India

Evangelicalism in India
Evangelical denominations in Asia